This is a list of Indian states and union territories by NSDP per capita. Net state domestic product (NSDP) is the state counterpart to a country's Net domestic product (NDP), which equals the gross domestic product (GDP) minus depreciation on a country's capital goods. The following table gives the latest available nominal NSDP per capita figures for the States and union territories of India at current prices in Indian rupees. No data is available for the union territories of Dadra and Nagar Haveli and Daman and Diu and  Ladakh.

List 
No data is available for the union territories of Andaman and Nicobar Islands.

Past NSDP per capita of Indian states
No data is available for the union territories of Dadra and Nagar Haveli, Daman and Diu and Lakshadweep.

Historical NSDP per capita of Indian states
No data is available for the union territories of Dadra and Nagar Haveli, Daman and Diu and Lakshadweep.

Notes

References

GDP per capita